Taylor Jonathan Yates (born May 28, 1987) is a former American football quarterback and coach who is the wide receivers coach for the Atlanta Falcons of the National Football League (NFL). He played college football at North Carolina and was drafted by the Houston Texans in the fifth round of the 2011 NFL Draft. He has also played for the Atlanta Falcons, Miami Dolphins, and Buffalo Bills.

Early years
Yates played in high-league football. He continued playing for his freshman high school team and into the 2003 season until moving his focus to basketball. Yates returned in 2005, where he played quarterback and punter for Pope High School, in the north Atlanta suburb of Marietta, where he earned Atlanta Metro First-Team All-Area honors.

College career
Yates played quarterback for the North Carolina Tar Heels at the University of North Carolina at Chapel Hill from 2006 to 2010. In the 2006 season, he redshirted. In the 2007 season, he finished with 2,655 passing yards, 14 touchdowns, and 18 interceptions. In the 2008 season, he suffered an ankle injury and had to miss some time. Overall, he finished with 1,168 passing yards, 11 touchdowns, and four interceptions. In the 2009 season, he finished with 2,136 passing yards, 14 touchdowns, and 15 interceptions. In the 2010 season, he finished with 3,418 passing yards, 19 touchdowns, and nine interceptions. Yates held school records for total career passing yards and single-season passing yards, breaking previous records set by Darian Durant, until he was passed by Tar Heel quarterbacks Sam Howell (total passing yards) and Mitch Trubisky (single-season). During his time in Chapel Hill, Yates was a member of the Alpha Tau chapter of the Sigma Chi fraternity.

Statistics

Professional career

Houston Texans
Yates was selected with the 152nd pick (fifth round) of the 2011 NFL Draft by the Houston Texans. He first saw action in a November 27, 2011, game against the Jacksonville Jaguars when quarterback Matt Leinart left the game with a collarbone injury, throwing 8-of-15 for 70 yards and a fumble. Yates made his first career start in the next game against the Atlanta Falcons, throwing 12-of-25 for 188 yards and a touchdown. Yates also became the first former University of North Carolina player to start an NFL game at quarterback. Yates started his second game on December 11 against the Cincinnati Bengals. Yates completed 26-of-44 passes for 300 yards. He threw two touchdowns and one interception and helped lead the Texans to their tenth win, clinching a playoff spot for the first time in franchise history. For his performance in the Bengals game he was named the Pepsi NFL Rookie of the Week. On January 7, 2012, in the Wild Card Round, Yates led the Texans to their first ever playoff win with the score of 31–10 over the Cincinnati Bengals (the same team Yates and the Texans beat to clinch their first ever playoff berth), becoming the fifth rookie quarterback to win a playoff game after finishing the game with 11 completed passes out of 20 attempted passes for a passer rating of 97.7 along with a 40 yard touchdown to Andre Johnson and 159 passing yards. The game was the first playoff game in NFL history that had two rookie quarterbacks starting for their respective teams (Andy Dalton was the other rookie). The Texans eventually lost to the Baltimore Ravens in the Divisional Round by a score of 20–13 after Yates completed 17 of 35 passes for 185 yards but also three interceptions and no touchdowns for a quarterback rating of 28.8.

Yates began the 2012 season second on the depth chart, behind quarterback Matt Schaub, but ahead of John Beck and undrafted rookie Case Keenum. He did not see much playing time in the 2012 season, finishing 4-of-10 for 38 yards and an interception while having one rushing touchdown, which occurred against the New England Patriots in a 42–14 loss. Yates replaced Schaub against the St. Louis Rams during the 2013 season, throwing two interceptions, one of which was returned for a touchdown. Yates ended 2013 completing 15 of 22 passes for 113 yards and two interceptions, while also being third on the depth chart behind Schaub and Keenum.

Atlanta Falcons
On June 18, 2014, Yates was traded to the Atlanta Falcons in return for linebacker Akeem Dent. On September 18, 2014, when the Falcons built a 49–0 lead against the Tampa Bay Buccaneers, Yates had his only playing time of the season, throwing 3-of-4 for 64 yards and one interception. He was released by the Falcons on September 4, 2015, as part of their final roster cuts.

Houston Texans (second stint)
Yates was signed by the Texans on October 27, 2015, after the team cut quarterback Ryan Mallett. He was signed to serve as a backup to Brian Hoyer. After Hoyer went out with an injury during a November 16 game against the Cincinnati Bengals, Yates replaced him in the third quarter, and eventually won the game 10–6 over the Bengals. In the game, Yates completed 5 of 11 passes for 69 yards and a touchdown. On December 20, Yates suffered a torn ACL in a game versus the Indianapolis Colts. On December 21, 2015, Yates was placed on injured reserve with a torn ACL, ending his season.

Miami Dolphins
Yates was signed by the Miami Dolphins on December 13, 2016, after a knee injury to Ryan Tannehill. After starting quarterback Matt Moore was hit hard by Pittsburgh Steelers linebacker Bud Dupree in the AFC Wild Card Round on January 8, 2017, Yates appeared for one snap but Moore then returned to the game.

Buffalo Bills
Yates was signed by the Buffalo Bills on April 10, 2017. He was placed on injured reserve on September 5, 2017, with a concussion. He was released on September 12, 2017, after agreeing to an injury settlement.

Houston Texans (third stint)
On November 3, 2017, Yates signed with the Houston Texans after a season-ending ACL injury to starter Deshaun Watson. Head coach Bill O'Brien said that Yates would be the backup to Tom Savage for the November 5 game against the Indianapolis Colts. On December 10 against the San Francisco 49ers, Yates entered the game late in the second quarter after Savage suffered a concussion. Yates completed 14-of-26 passes for 176 yards and two touchdowns as the Texans lost by a score of 26–16. Due to Savage's injury, Yates started the final three games of the season. In Week 15, against the Jacksonville Jaguars, he finished 12-of-31 for 128 yards, one touchdown, and one interception in the 45–7 loss. On Christmas Day, against the [[2017 Pittsburgh Steelers seasonPittsburgh Steelers, he finished with 83 passing yards, one touchdown, and one interception in the 34–6 loss. In the regular season finale, in the second divisional game against the Indianapolis Colts, he finished with 137 passing yards and an interception in the 22–13 loss.

Coaching career

Houston Texans
On February 5, 2019, Yates was hired as an offensive assistant by the Texans to replace Wes Welker.

After the 2019 NFL season, Yates was promoted to assistant quarterbacks coach.

Atlanta Falcons
On January 30, 2021, Yates was hired as a passing game specialist by the Falcons.

On March 22, 2022, he became the team’s wide receivers coach.

NFL career statistics

References

External links

North Carolina Tar Heels bio

1987 births
Living people
Sportspeople from Marietta, Georgia
Players of American football from Marietta, Georgia
American football quarterbacks
North Carolina Tar Heels football players
Houston Texans players
Atlanta Falcons players
Miami Dolphins players
Buffalo Bills players
Houston Texans coaches
Atlanta Falcons coaches